Rice's whale (Balaenoptera ricei), also known as the Gulf of Mexico whale, is a species of baleen whale endemic to the northern Gulf of Mexico. Initially identified as a subpopulation of the Bryde's whale, genetic and skeletal studies found it to be a distinct species by 2021. In outward appearance, it is virtually identical to the Bryde's whale. Its body is streamlined and sleek, with a uniformly dark charcoal gray dorsal and pale to pinkish underside. A diagnostic feature often used by field scientists to distinguish Rice's whales from whales other than the Bryde's whale is the three prominent ridges that line the top of its head. The species can be distinguished from the Bryde's whale by the shape of the nasal bones, which have wider gaps due to a unique wrapping by the frontal bones, its unique vocal repertoire, and genetic differences.

It does not migrate but remains within this area year-round. The whale's diet remains unknown, but lanternfish and hatchetfish are suspected prey.

The Rice's whale is on the brink of extinction and is alongside the vaquita as one of the most endangered cetaceans in the world. It is listed as critically endangered in the IUCN Red List and protected under the United States Endangered Species Act. The best population estimate is 33, with as little as 16 mature individuals, and the population is continuing to decline. The reasons why the species' population declined to its current state remains poorly understood, but scientists believe that the industrialization of the Gulf of Mexico and the increase of anthropogenic activities within its habitat are primary contributors; unlike most baleen whales it is unlikely that whaling had an impact. Today, the Rice's whale's main threats are related to industrial and commercial activities within its habitat, including oil pollution, ship collisions, and underwater noise from seismic surveys and vessel traffic. It has also shown to be especially vulnerable to local catastrophic events such as the 2010 Deepwater Horizon oil spill, which single-handedly killed nearly twenty percent of the species' population.

Taxonomy

Discovery and naming

The Rice's whale was likely first documented by the Yankee whaling ship Keziah in 1790, which reported the chasing of a "finback" in the Bay of Campeche. At least 49 additional encounters of "finbacks" were reported throughout the Gulf of Mexico during the 18th and 19th centuries. Scientists generally agree that the "finbacks" were most likely Rice's whales, as the species is the only baleen whale that resides in the Gulf year-round. While fin whales (of which the name "finback" applies to today), blue whales, sei whales, and common minke whales have been sighted in the Gulf of Mexico, their presence is extralimital and they only appear in the area as occasional wanderers. The Rice's whale was first scientifically recognized by late cetologist Dale Rice in 1965, but as a local population of the closely related Bryde's whale. The extent of its modern geographic isolation was uncovered during the 1990s. During the 20th and early 21st centuries, this group of supposed Bryde's whales was vernacularly referred to as the "Gulf of Mexico whale."

A 2014 mitochondrial and nuclear DNA study by Rosel and Wilcox discovered that the Gulf of Mexico whales belong to a genetically distinct lineage that does not belong to either of the two members of the Bryde's whale complex (B. edeni brydei and B. edeni edeni), demonstrating that they may be a new subspecies or species. However, the study refrained from describing a new taxon, which requires a then-absent holotype specimen to erect. The taxonomic situation remained unchanged until 2019 when a dead individual washed up at Everglades National Park in Florida, providing the needed holotype without having to kill or harm any living members of the critically endangered population. This specimen was buried to decompose into a skeleton, exhumed, and transported to the Smithsonian Institution, where it is now cataloged as USNM 594665. In a 2021 taxonomic study, Rosel, Wilcox, and colleagues demonstrated through USNM 594665 that the Gulf of Mexico whale is also morphologically distinct from the Bryde's whale, thus confirming its identity as a new species. The subsequent scientific name Balaenoptera ricei and common name Rice's whale honor Rice for his role in discovering the whales' existence and to commemorate his 60-year contributions to marine mammal science. The study also commented that the naming was done to complement the trend of naming members of the Bryde's whale complex after people.

However, some scientists maintain the use of "Gulf of Mexico whale" as the preferred common name. A 2022 letter by Peter Corkeron of New England Aquarium and colleagues argued that most baleen whales have common names based on their geographic origin (with exceptions typically for wide-ranging species), that specifying a geographic origin encourages greater awareness of the species' endangered status, that the trend of Bryde's whale complex members having names honoring people is inconsistent (i.e. the sei whale's common name references a fish and scientific name a geographic region), and that promoting such perceived trend risks glorifying problematic namesakes (i.e. Eden's whale honors Ashley Eden, a colonial officer of British India). Rosel and colleagues published a response letter in the same journal issue presenting counterarguments, namely that "Gulf of Mexico whale" is too ambiguous and may be confused with other local cetaceans, that a region-specific name alienates outsiders and risks reducing global interest, and that encouraging an alternate common name when "Rice's whale" is already widely used will increase confusion.

Phylogeny
The Rice's whale is a type of "Bryde's-like whale," a group of rorquals within the genus Balaenoptera that are distinct genetically and in skeletal morphology but are near-indistinguishable in outward appearance. Other members of this group include the Bryde's whale (B. brydei), Eden's whale (B. edeni), and Omura's whale (B. omurai). However, Rosel et al. (2021) commented that the term may no longer be necessary.

The following cladogram is modified from a phylogenetic tree constructed by Rosel et al. (2021) based on mitochondrial DNA. Based on the study, the Rice's whale's closest living relative is the Eden's whale. The two form a clade that forms a polytomy with the sei whale and Bryde's whale.

Description

It is an intermediate-sized rorqual that is usually about the same size as the Eden's whale, although few adults have been reliably measured to date. In the wild, another calf has been observed to be around half the length of its supposed parent.

Appearance and coloring

In external appearance, the Rice's whale and Bryde's whale are virtually identical and when compared can only be conclusively distinguished by their genetics, skeletal anatomy, and acoustic signatures. Like the Bryde's whale, the body shape is streamlined and sleek. The dorsal fin is shaped like a large hook that can range between ~ tall in adults and located around two-thirds of the length back from the snout. The flat and somewhat pointed rostrum (top of the head) shows three prominent ridges: a large ridge along the center and two smaller ridges on the left and right sides. This unique trait only appears in Rice's whales and members of the Bryde's whale complex, making it a diagnostic feature when whale watching.

The dorsal side of the body is uniformly dark charcoal gray, although this is sometimes reported as dark brown. The belly and underside of the tail is pale to pinkish. This light coloring is especially prominent on the ventral side of the peduncle. There is neither asymmetric pigmentation on the lower jaws nor blaze or chevron pattering on the body, which distinguishes the Rice's whale from fin whales and Omura's whales. The flippers are uniformly dark-colored. In some phenotypic variations, a gradient of white also appears around the rim of the dorsal fin and/or along the side of the body, but there is no consistency of the trait between individual whales.

Forty-four to 54 ventral pleats run down the underside of the mouth, which are creases that allows the whale to expand the inside of its mouth when feeding. The pleats usually reach up to the navel, but some pleats extend beyond it. In the holotype specimen, one pleat extended  beyond the navel and two additional elongated pleats were observed, although they could not be measured.

Skeleton

Knowledge of the skeletal anatomy is largely inferred from the holotype. However, it is not the only skeletal remains of Rice's whales accessible to science. Rosel et al. (2021) listed three additional specimens that were recovered in earlier years. The first is a skull (LSUMZ 17027) that was discovered in the Chandeleur Islands, Louisiana in 1954, which was initially identified as a fin whale but later genetically confirmed to be a Rice's whale. However, the skull is incomplete. Prior to the stranding of USNM 594665, this was considered a candidate specimen to serve as the Rice's whale holotype, but upon its excavation in 2018 it was found that the skull was crushed and much of the skeleton corroded as tides submerged it in water over the nine years it was buried.

Skull

The skull morphology between Rice's whales and Bryde's whale diverge in the nasals and adjacent bones, which are the primary diagnostic features defined by Rosel et al. (2021) that morphologically distinguishes between the two species. In the Rice's whale, the frontal bones uniquely wrap around the posterior tips of triangular nasal bones and extend down in between them, which opens a larger gap compared to Bryde's whale and Eden's whale and does not narrow posteriorly. The Rice's whale can also be distinguished from the Eden's whale by the narrow exposure of the frontals between the maxilla's ascending processes and supraoccipital, and from the Omura's whale by how the premaxilla extends to the frontals.

Like all baleen whales, the jawlines of the skull are lined with bristles of baleen instead of teeth. In Rice's whales, the fringes of these plates throughout the jawline and all baleen in the anterior jaw positions are uniformly cream in color, which darken into black in the posterior positions above the fringe. The number of plates per jawline is variable and may between 230 to 290 plates.

Postcranial
There are fifty-three vertebrae in the spinal column. This is slightly fewer than in relatives like the sei whale and Bryde's whale, which have 56-57 and 54-55 vertebrae respectively. The vertebral formula is: seven cervical vertebrae in the neck, thirteen thoracic vertebrae in the upper back, thirteen lumbar vertebrae in the lower back, and twenty caudal vertebrae in the tail. Thirteen pairs of ribs connect each thoracic vertebrae, with the head of each first rib bifurcating into two ends. There are a few unique features in the postcranial skeleton. The stylohyal bone, the largest component of the hyoid apparatus that stabilizes the larynx, pharynx, and tongue, is broad and exhibits little curvature. This contrasts with the stylohyal bones in Bryde's whales, which have a degree of curvature and are longer than wide. In the vestigial hip, the pelvic bones are nearly straight, with only one side having a tiny projection.

Range and habitat

The Rice's whale is mainly restricted to the northeastern Gulf of Mexico. Specifically, scientists identified its core habitat range as a small stretch along the continental slope between depths of  within and near the De Soto Canyon off the coasts of western Florida, Alabama, and eastern Louisiana. It is a non-migratory species and usually stays within this area year-round, making it the only known baleen whale resident to the Gulf of Mexico. The reason as to why the Rice's whale restricts itself to such a small habitat range remains unknown. There were a few live sightings in the western Gulf outside the core habitat, including one sighted off the coast of Texas that was genetically confirmed as a Rice's whale via biopsy. Acoustic surveys off western Louisiana in 2019 also detected Rice's whale calls. These observations occurred on the continental slope at similar depth ranges to the core habitat. There is little evidence that these are attempts in regularly inhabiting western waters, though they may contain a marginal habitat zone.

Whaling logbooks during the 18th and 19th centuries document at least 50 occurrences of "finbacks" (likely Rice's whales) distributed throughout the Gulf of Mexico, suggesting that the species once had had a wider historical distribution. It is still unknown why the Rice's whale's distribution has declined to its current state, but the NOAA considers increased industrialization throughout the Gulf of Mexico and the subsequent underwater noise it brought a likely major factor. It is unlikely that whaling was another major factor, as the species did not recover from supposed whaling mortalities as seen in cetaceans that have been hunted in the past despite local whaling having been defunct for over a century ago, and there are no recorded kill counts.

While the distribution within the American exclusive economic zone in the northern half of the Gulf has been extensively surveyed, the southern Mexican half remains poorly studied, and there remains a possibility that a previously undetected population of Rice's whale might exist there. Opportunistic visual surveys have been conducted between 1997 and 1999 during a series of six oceanographic surveys within the Bay of Campeche and Yucatán Channel. Only one unidentified rorqual was sighted. However, these efforts did not survey other potential habitat locations such as the continental slope north of the Campeche Bank, where a number of historical Rice's whales were recorded. A compilation of recent isolated cetacean encounters in the Mexican Gulf collected by Ortega-Ortiz in 2002 found no records of potential Rice's whales.

Several standings from the Atlantic Ocean have been documented, including whales along eastern Florida, Georgia, the Chesapeake Bay in Virginia, and two genetically confirmed cases from North Carolina and South Carolina. The genetically unconfirmed cases are usually referred to as simply Bryde's-like whales due to the inability to visually differentiate between the Rice's whale and Bryde's whale, which is present in deeper Atlantic waters. In addition, acoustic studies off Jacksonville, Florida and Cherry Point, North Carolina were unable to detect Rice's whale calls. It is therefore evident that Rice's whales are at best extremely rare in Atlantic waters. James G. Mead of the International Whaling Commission suggested that the stranded records are most likely strays that wandered from the Gulf of Mexico.

Ecology and behavior

Feeding and diving behavior

Little is known about the feeding ecology of Rice's whales, but it differs from the feeding behavior of Bryde's whales. Bryde's whales typically feed on a variety of pelagic prey such as schooling fish like anchovies, sardines, menhaden, and herring, copepods, krill, and salps near the surface, but surface feeding has never been observed in Rice's whales.

In 2015, scientists tagged a Rice's whale, which provided nearly 3 days (63.85 hours) worth of information about the diving behavior of the animal. It revealed that the Rice's whale had a diel vertical diving pattern, spending its day in deep water and night near the surface. A total of 119 daytime deep dives were recorded, with only 43% of the daytime spent within  of the surface. Lunge feeding was detected during the deepest parts of the dives, which indicates the Rice's whale was feeding at or just above the seafloor. What exactly it was feeding on remains a mystery, but lanternfish and hatchetfish are common in these areas, so it is possible that they are part of the Rice's whale diet.

GPS data from the 2010 tagged individual found that the whale swam at an average sustained speed, the speed at which the animal travels without tiring, of  when staying within a specific location, and  when traveling over long distances.

Vocalization
The whale may exhibit a unique vocal repertoire that differs from the acoustic signatures of Bryde's whales or any other known baleen whale, making vocalization a potential diagnostic feature. Five call types are known for wild Rice's whale, although only three of them have been definitively linked to the species. Two additional call types have also been documented from a captive juvenile. Each individual makes around 22 calls per day, with each call producing on average 8.2 sounds per hour.

Long-moans are the most common call types. They usually last between 20–27 seconds at a frequency range between 43-208 Hz and exhibit a regular pattern of amplitude modulation with a modulation frequency of 3.4 Hz. In occasional association with long-moans are tonal-sequences, which consists of a series of narrow-bandwidth tonals that each have an average duration of 3.6 seconds at a frequency range of 99.4-107.4 Hz. The tonal-sequences can contain up to 6 different tonals. The occurrence of tonal-sequences after long-moans are relatively rare; only 3.2% of documented long-moans are followed by tonal-sequences with a mean time gap of 3.87 seconds. A last set of call types are the downsweeps, brief sounds characterized by a sharp drop in frequency from beginning to end. In the Rice's whale, there are multiple documented variations of downsweeps. The first variation is the downsweep-sequence that occurs in repetition; sequences range between 2 to 27 downsweeps with an average of 0.8 seconds between each downsweep. Each individual downsweep usually lasts 0.3 seconds with frequencies beginning at 113 Hz and ending at 51 Hz. Another variation consists of "pulse pairs" of downswept pulses that start with a start-end frequency range of 143–78 Hz with individual pulses and interpulse intervals ranging between 0.4-0.7 seconds and 0.6-1.3 seconds respectively. A third possible variation consists of a three-segment sequence of downsweeps that occur at higher frequencies of 170–110 Hz. Each segment may include single downsweep, doublets, or triplets. Of these five documented call types, only the long-moans, downsweep-sequences, and pulse pairs have been definitively linked with individual whales. The other two documented types have yet to be verified in the same manner, but scientists generally agree that they belong to the Rice's whale through parsimony.

In November 1988, a stranded female was rescued and treated in captivity at SeaWorld Orlando until her release in January 1989. This whale was  juvenile estimated to be around 1–2 years old. While in captivity, her acoustic signatures were monitored, and two types of calls were documented. The first was a growl-like pulsed moan that lasted between 0.5–51 seconds at a rate of 20-70 pulses per second with a frequency range of 200–900 Hz. They were first detected during late December and occurred periodically in the absence of humans in the tank, stopping only when the tank's surface sprinkler system was turned off in preparation for feeding or repair. The second was a sequence of discrete pulses lasting 10 milliseconds each at a frequency range of 400–600 Hz with intervals of 50-130 milliseconds between each pulse. They were rare, but sometimes occurred immediately before, after, or in-between a moan. These call types are unique among Rice's whales, but they may be due to the special circumstances of the captive juvenile. It is possible that the growl-like moans may be related to distress, as similar types of sounds have been documented in other baleen whales when disturbed or in agony. Based on vocal patterns of terrestrial mammals, the moans may also be related to isolation. It is also possible that the two documented call types may be related to age, and that the captive juvenile was intermediate between those of adults and calves. When vocalizing, the whale lowered her head slightly and blew bubbles from her right blowhole. Because this was the only other time it opened, the other when breathing in which both blowholes opened, it is possible that the right blowhole may have had a function with vocalization, specifically the growl-like moans. However, alternative explanations such as illness or behavioral display could not be discounted.

Predation

There are no known observations of predation on Rice's whales, but it is likely that its main predator is the killer whale, which is known in the Gulf of Mexico, as they have been seen attacking local sperm whales and dolphins and are the only known natural predator of the Bryde's whale. There is debated speculation that some baleen whales migrate as an anti-predator adaptation, but the Rice's whale is a non-migratory species that clearly lacks this trait. A known common defensive behavior of rorquals is to flee upon encounter by killer whales, although this would be less effective when a calf is needed to be protected. Killer whales have also been observed to efficiently kill calves within minutes to hours in such a scenario. Given the likely low reproductive rate of Rice's whales due to their small numbers, the species would be especially vulnerable to such predation if it exists, although its rarity makes the chance of observing predation extremely low. The hunting of only a few calves or mothers can be sufficient enough to drive the population into a predator pit, a situation where the population is trapped in indefinitely low numbers due to predation.

Another potential predator may be the great white shark, which is known to hunt North Atlantic right whale calves in nursery waters off the coast of Florida and Georgia. In addition, it is a common scavenger of Bryde's whale carcasses elsewhere in the world. Like killer whales, however, there is no direct proof that great whites hunt Rice's whales.

Conservation status
The Rice's whale is on the brink of extinction and is one of the most endangered cetaceans in the world alongside the vaquita. Prior to its 2021 description as a distinct species, it was assessed as a subpopulation of the Bryde's whale. The Rice's whale is listed as critically endangered in the IUCN Red List. It is not individually listed in the Convention on International Trade in Endangered Species of Wild Fauna and Flora, but the Bryde's whale is listed in Appendix I. The U.S. government also lists the Rice's whale as endangered under the Endangered Species Act, thus banning all activities that may directly harm the species within American waters. However, the designation of a critical habitat as mandated under the Act has yet to occur, as information on the habitat ecology remains insufficient.

Population
Both male and female Rice's whales remain and breed within the Gulf of Mexico, contrasting with coexisting local sperm whales that see males wander outside and breed with females from other locations. The Rice's whale sex ratio is somewhat close to 50:50; examinations of 32 whales identified 18 females and 14 males. Individuals are usually seen alone or in pairs but have occasionally been sighted forming larger loose groups that are believed to be associated with feeding.

Population estimates are below 100 individuals and 50 mature individuals. Multiple population studies of the species have been conducted since 1991, but due to the difficulty in surveying Rice's whales they are largely based on models and reliable exact figures are difficult to determine. Most models are statistically imprecise, having high coefficients of variation (>CV 0.4). They are also restricted to within the northern Gulf and do not take into account the possible existence of Rice's whales in the southern half. The best estimate to date is 33 individuals (CV 1.07) per a 2009 survey. Studies in prior years have approximated abundances throughout the entire northern Gulf of Mexico ranging from 15 to 44 individuals (CV 0.61-1.1). Separate estimates exclusive to the northwestern Gulf have produced figures ranging between 0 to 3 individuals (CV 0.81-1.08). These estimates are not comparable to each other through time differences as different variables were applied to each study such as the inclusion or exclusion of habitat stratification.

A 2015 study by Roberts and colleagues produced a larger estimate of 44 whales based on a habitat modeling technique that integrates survey data between 1994-2009. This study had the lowest coefficient of variation (CV 0.27), but its estimate aggregated over time. In the same year, a research team commissioned by the U.S. Fish and Wildlife Service produced an estimate of 26 individuals (CV 0.4) when specifically accounting for damage caused by the Deepwater Horizon oil spill using 2003-2009 survey data and different geographic borders than the 2009 estimate. More recently, a 2016 status report for the Endangered Species Act estimated the number of remaining mature individuals at 16, while the 2017 edition of the IUCN Red List puts this at 17 with the general population trend continuing to decrease.

Due to its extremely low population, the Rice's whale also faces the threat of inbreeding depression, which consequentially severely weakens the remaining population's ability to recover and survive due to the reduction of genetic diversity and accumulation of harmful mutations. To assess how well a population can survive on its own in the wild, geneticists employ the 50/500 rule, where the threshold for a population to successfully combat inbreeding depression is 50 individuals and to reduce mutation-creating genetic drift is 500 individuals. Because the Rice's whale's mature population is far below these thresholds, additional ecological traits such as a k-seletected reproduction strategy slows the chance of recovery even further and puts the species at a high chance of entering a phenomenon known as an extinction vortex. It has been projected that an assumed population of 35 Rice's whales would take 68 years to recover to 500 individuals. During this period, the species is more vulnerable to catastrophic events that can further damage the population's recovery chances. Such catastrophes have already happened, the most devastating being the 2010 Deepwater Horizon oil spill.

Threats

Pollution

Oil spills are one of the greatest threats to the species. Multiple offshore drilling operations take place in the Gulf of Mexico, many nearby the Rice's whale core habitat range. Accidents from these operations can release huge quantities of oil into the ocean, which can inflict a range of harmful to lethal effects to marine life including respiratory, digestive, and endocrine disruption, impaired vision, reproductive failure, increased susceptibility to diseases, and direct poisoning. In Rice's whales, contact with oil can also directly damage their baleen and thereby impair the ability to feed. Large oil spills require tremendous human effort to clean up, and some of the most efficient methods in doing so such as the use of dispersants can themselves be toxic to the whale. In addition, oil residue can persist in the environment and inflict long-term damage. Oil spills in the Gulf of Mexico are frequent; between 2011 and 2013 alone there were 46 oil spills that released the equivalent of nearly one thousand barrels of oil into the Gulf. A 2015 study to assess the damage inflicted to the species' population found that the oil covered 48% of the core habitat range and reduced the population by 22%: 17% of Rice's whales were killed, 22% of females suffered reproductive failure, and 18% of whales suffered adverse health effects.

Plastic ingestion as a product of increased plastic pollution is another documented source of mortality. The holotype USNM 594665 is currently the only recorded case of death via plastic ingestion. A sharp piece of plastic  in size was discovered inside its stomach that lacerated the gastric organ, causing internal bleeding and acute gastric necrosis that led to the whale's stranding and death. However, the NOAA deemed plastic ingestion as a likely low threat to Rice's whales given that such incidents are generally rare in the Gulf of Mexico; less than one percent of stranded marine mammals in the Gulf between 2000 and 2014 showed evidence of ingesting debris. However, it was acknowledged that marine mammal stranding data may not be comprehensive enough.

Vessel collision and entanglement

Collision with ships has been documented in Rice's whales. The lactating female from Tampa Bay (USNM 593536) showed signs of severed vertebrae, lung damage, and internal bruises consistent with a death by a ship strike. In 2019, a live Rice's whale was sighted with a severely deformed spine behind the dorsal fin, damage that is also consistent with vessel collision. The diel vertical diving pattern of the Rice's whale makes it especially susceptible to such collision accidents, given that they may spend the majority of their nighttime hours within  of the surface, which is also the range that puts cetaceans at the greatest risk of colliding with ships. In addition, the whales are known to at times to be curious around ships and periodically approach them to investigate. Rice's whale's most important habitats in the De Soto Canyon and the adjacent continental slope off western Florida are within zones that saw on average 1-25 ships in vessel traffic between 2009 and 2010, but a few shipping lanes that can see up nearly a hundred ships per year also pass through the habitat zone. Some areas in the Gulf of Mexico's northwestern side that have seen nearby occasional Rice's whales are some of the busiest sectors of the Gulf, with hundreds to up to over a thousand ships transiting the area in one year. The lack of quantity in documented ship strikes in the species does not discount its factor as a major anthropomorphic threat. Vessel collisions with cetaceans are generally underreported, and the rarity of Rice's whales would make this issue even greater.

The Rice's whale's usual habitat also overlaps with deep-water reef fish fisheries, which operate by dropping bottom longline nets at the seafloor between depths of  during daytime hours to catch yellowedge groupers, tilefish, and sharks. As this is around the time when Rice's whales feed in the same depths, there is a risk of entanglement with the seafloor nets. One genetically unconfirmed  Rice's whale that washed up in 1974 was determined to have been killed by gear entanglement.

Underwater noise
A multitude of anthropogenic noises are produced in great quantities from industrial activities throughout the Gulf of Mexico that can harm baleen whales. The loudest and most frequent are seismic surveys associated with offshore oil and gas activities, which occur on a 24 hours per day and 365 days per year basis. Surveys operate by blasting sound waves into the ocean using airguns at frequencies between 5–300 Hz, intensities as high as 260 dB, and pulse rates of one blast every 10–20 seconds. Cetaceans can obtain permanent hearing loss when exposed to sound intensities of 230 dB or higher. As mitigation, seismic surveys are often mandated to be accompanied by protected species observers and to immediately cease operations whenever within  of a whale.

Another major source of underwater noise is vessel traffic, which contributes significantly to low-frequency noise pollution in the Gulf of Mexico. Scientists expect that this will increase in the future as the Gulf becomes a more commercially important area thanks to developments such as the expansion of the Panama Canal. Shipping noise frequencies often overlap with the acoustics of baleen whales. This can cause auditory masking, which can diminish or block a whale's ability to communicate or detect environmental cues. To work around this problem, the whale may alter its vocalization behavior, but this can further disrupt its communication abilities. In addition, frequent exposure to underwater noise generates a high level of stress for receiving whales, which can alter stress hormone levels, feeding behavior, or cause habitat displacement in avoidance of the noise. Impacts specific to the Rice's whale have yet to be studied, but research on other baleen whales indicates that adverse effects to vessel noise are universal. Studies of Atlantic right whales, whose vocal frequencies are similar to that of Rice's whales and thus may be of similar impact, predicted that vessel noise reduces their communication space by 77%.

See also

 Environmental impact of the Deepwater Horizon oil spill
 List of cetaceans
 Baleen whale

Footnotes

References

External links

 Gulf of Mexico Bryde's Whale
 NOAA Lists Gulf of Mexico Bryde’s Whales as Endangered

Baleen whales
Mammals described in 2021
Biota of the Gulf of Mexico
Critically endangered fauna of the United States
ESA endangered species
Taxobox binomials not recognized by IUCN